Elbert Dubenion (February 16, 1933 – December 26, 2019) was an American football flanker who spent his entire nine-season professional career with the Buffalo Bills of the American Football League (AFL). He played college football for Bluffton College (now Bluffton University).

Dubenion, the longest-tenured member of the team's inaugural roster despite being 27 years old at the start of his professional career, is considered one of the best players in the team's history and was an archetype of the AFL's emphasis on speed and the long bomb, both of which were two of Dubenion's greatest strengths and earned him the nickname "Golden Wheels".

Career
Dubenion was drafted in the fourteenth round of the 1959 NFL Draft by the Cleveland Browns of the National Football League. His relatively old age (26 at the time) and hailing from a smaller college meant that he was never considered a serious prospect, and the Browns released him prior to the start of the season.

Dubenion was among many AFL players from smaller and less renowned colleges that the league was signing in search of talent that the NFL had overlooked, and the Buffalo Bills signed him as a free agent. During his rookie season, one of his quarterbacks, Johnny Green, gave Dubenion a backhanded compliment regarding his speed and alleged inability to catch a football, noting that he had "golden wheels." The nickname Golden Wheels stuck for the remainder of his career.

In his rookie season, Dubenion had seven touchdowns and 752 receiving yards on 42 catches, a 17.9 yd/catch average. He ran 16 times for 94 yards and a touchdown, a 5.6 yd/carry average. In 1961, facing tighter and deeper coverages, he upped his production as a runner, rushing for 173 yards and a touchdown on just 17 carries, a 10.3 yd/carry average.   He had 31 catches for 461 yards and six touchdowns.

In 1964, Dubenion had one of the most sensational seasons of any receiver in pro football history, scoring 10 touchdowns among his 42 receptions for 1,139 yards, while collecting 27.1 yards per catch. In nine seasons, he totalled 296 receptions for 5,424 yards and 36 TDs for a career average of 18.3 yd/catch, and rushed for 360 yards and three touchdowns on 48 carries, a career average of seven yds/carry. When Wray Carlton was released by the Bills on September 2, 1968, it made Dubenion the last player from the Bills original roster in 1960 to still be with the club.

Dubenion ranks seventh all-time in the AFL in receptions and reception yardage.   He holds the record for the longest reception in AFL playoff history, a 93-yd touchdown reception from quarterback Daryle Lamonica against the Boston Patriots in 1963.  He was a 1993 inductee of the Greater Buffalo Sports Hall of Fame and his number 44 is officially in "reduced circulation," meaning although it is not officially retired, current players cannot wear the number out of deference to Dubenion.

Death
Dubenion died December 26, 2019, from complications related to Parkinson's disease.

See also
 List of American Football League players

References

External links
 

1933 births
2019 deaths
American football wide receivers
Bluffton Beavers football players
Buffalo Bills players
American Football League All-Star players
Players of American football from Georgia (U.S. state)
People from Griffin, Georgia
American Football League players
Neurological disease deaths in Ohio
Deaths from Parkinson's disease